A subhashita (subhāṣita) is a literary genre of Sanskrit epigrammatic poems and their message is an aphorism, maxim, advice, fact, truth, lesson or riddle. Su in Sanskrit means good; bhashita means spoken; which together literally means well spoken or eloquent saying.

Subhashitas in Sanskrit are short memorable verses, typically in four padas (verses) but sometimes just two, but their structure follows a meter. Subhashitas are one of many forms of creative works that have survived from ancient and medieval era of India, and sometimes known as Suktis. Ancient and medieval Indian literature created tens of thousands of subhashitas covering a vast range of subjects.

These epigrammatic verses and their anthologies are also referred to as Subhashitavali or Subhashitani.

Philosophy 
Subhashitas are known for their inherent moral and ethical advice, instructions in worldly wisdom and guidance in making righteous deeds. Subhashitas create an appeal as the inherent message is conveyed through poems which quote practical examples which are often rhythmic in nature. Some authors even relate Subhashitas to sugar coated bitter medicines considering their worthiness. 

The subhashita deals with various subjects and includes topics of day to day experiences that every one can easily relate to. A subhashita is always eloquent in form, structured in a poetical form, complete in itself and concisely depicts a single emotion, idea, dharma, truth or situation.

Structure 
Subhashitas are structured in pada-s (Sanskrit: पद, or lines) in which a thought or a truth is condensed. These epigrammatic verses typically have four padas (verse, quatrain), are poetic and set in a meter. Many are composed in the metrical unit called Anuṣṭubh of Sanskrit poetry, making them easy to remember and melodic when recited. But sometimes Subhashitas with two pada-s or even one pada proclaim a truth.

According to Mohana Bhāradvāja, Subhashita in Indian Literature is a single verse or single stanza, descriptive or didactic but complete in itself expressing a single idea, devotional, ethical or erotic in a witty or epigrammatic way. Author Ludwik Sternbach describes that such wise sayings in poetic form not only contain beautiful thoughts but they also make the expressions in cultivated language. He further says that such form of Indian literature had a tinge of poetry, the poetical skill being exhibited in the intricate play of words which created a slight wit, humour, satire and sententious precepts; they arose laughter, scorn, compass and other moods. The poetic style of narration found in Subhashita is also termed as muktaka (independent), as the meaning or the mood of which is complete in itself. This poetic form has been compared to Persian rubai or  Japanese tanka by some authors.

Sources 
The authors of most Subhashita are unknown. This form of Indian epigrammatic poetry had a wide following, were created, memorized and transmitted by word of mouth.

The works of many ancient Indian scholars like Bhartṛhari (5th century CE), Chanakya (3rd century BC), Kalidasa (5th century AD), Bhavabhuti (8th century AD), Bhallata (10th century AD), Somadeva Bhatta (11th century AD), Kshemendra (11th century AD), Kalhana (12th century AD) are considered to be treasures of many valuable subhashitas. The famous Panchatantra (3rd century BC) and Hitopadesha (12th century AD) which is a collection of animal fables effectively use subhashitas to express the inherent moral wisdom of their stories. The Vedas and ancient scriptures like Bhagavad Gita, Puranas, Ramayana, and Mahabharata are also major sources of Subhashitas.

Dedicated works
There are also various individual works such as Subhashita Sudhanidhi by Sayana of the 14th century, Samayochita padyamalika which are dedicated works of wisdom literature consisting of various subhashitas.

Collection of verses (Subhashita Sangraha)
From the beginning of the 10th century AD several writers contributed immensely in collecting and preserving different wise sayings of contemporary and earlier poets. Author Vishnulok Bihari Srivastava opines that such subhashita sangrahas (collection of verses) have done a great service by preserving several rare subhashitas which would have otherwise been lost.  A few such literary works are listed below. 

Other anthologies of subhashita verses from unknown and known authors, estimated from early 1st millennium AD, are Jayavallabha's Vajjalagga and Chapannaya's Gahao. However these verses are in regional Prakrit languages of India, derived from Sanskrit.

Subhashita Manjari, verse 1.5, explains the importance of Subhashita with a subhashita:

Other illustrations of Subhashita are:

There are tens of thousands of Subhashita in Indian literature covering topics as diverse as humor, sarcasm, criticism, politics, eroticism, emotions, love, wealth, daily life, society, learning, stages of life, ethics, morals, spirituality, deities, medicine, food, festivals, prayer, riddles, science, mathematics, poetry, language, art, Vedas, Upanishads, Puranas, Itihasas, and other subjects.

Related terms
Lokokti (or lokavakya, pracinavakya) are Sanskrit proverbs, in the form of short sentences that express truths or facts, but they differ from Subhashitas in not being in poetical form. An example of a Sanskrit lokokti is:

A sutra is another ancient Indian literary form. Sutras are concise wisdom or truth, but typically they too are not poetical. Unlike subhashitas and lokokti whose authors are unknown or long forgotten, sutras are attributed to sages, famous or known personalities. Sutras typically need to be read within a context to be completely understood. An example of a Sanskrit Sutra attributed to Chanakya is:

Translations 
Many Subhashitas in Sanskrit have been translated into other regional languages of India.

References

Further reading
 Ludwik Sternbach, Similar Thoughts in the Mahābhārata, the Literature of "Greater India" and in the Christian Gospels, Journal of the American Oriental Society, Vol. 91, No. 3 (Jul. - Sep., 1971), pp. 438-442
 Ludwik Sternbach (1975), Indian riddles: a forgotten chapter in the history of Sanskrit literature, Vishveshvaranand Indological Series, 67/Vishveshvaranand Institute Publications, 632 , Review: Journal of the Royal Asiatic Society of Great Britain & Ireland, 
 D. Bhagwat, The Riddle in Indian Life, Lore and Literature, Popular Prakashan, Bombay (1965)
 Kashinath Sharma, Subhashita Ratna Bhandagara, A collection of over 10,000 subhasitas (in Sanskrit, bibliography in English)
 Daniel J. Bisgaard (1994), Chapter 5, 

Sanskrit literature
Sanskrit poetry
Indian poetry